Corey Hart is the seventh album by Corey Hart, released in 1996. It generated four charting singles in Canada.

Track listing
All songs written by Corey Hart, except as noted.

"Black Cloud Rain" - 4:22
"Someone" - 4:36
"Love Hurts" - 4:19 (Boudleaux Bryant)
"Third of June" - 4:36
"Simplicity" - 4:32
"Tell Me" - 3:35
"Angel of My Soul" - 4:25
"Sunflowers" - 4:58
"Kiss the Sky" - 3:18
"On Your Own" - 4:08
"India" - 4:20

Personnel 
 Corey Hart – lead vocals, backing vocals (1-8), arrangements (1, 2, 4-11)
 Claude Gaudette – programming (1, 10), keyboards (2, 3, 4, 6, 7, 11), Hammond B3 organ (8, 9)
 Tony Smith – keyboards (4, 5, 11)
 Greg Phillinganes – acoustic piano (7, 8)
 Dean Parks – acoustic guitar (1, 10)
 Tim Pierce – guitar (1, 2, 3, 6, 9), nylon guitar (1), acoustic guitar (4, 11), mandolin (4)
 Michael Thompson – slide guitar (1), acoustic guitar (2), guitar (3, 5, 7, 8, 9), electric guitar (4, 11), sitar (4), dobro (8)
 Pat Buchanan – guitar (2, 6)
 Michael Landau – guitar (4), electric guitar (10)
 Mike Brignardello – bass (2, 4, 5, 6, 9, 11)
 John Pierce – bass (3)
 Nathan East – bass (7, 8)
 Kenny Aronoff – drums (1-9), percussion (1, 5, 6, 9, 11)
 Rafael Padilla – percussion (4, 7, 11)
 Michael Haynes – trumpet (6)
 Julie Masse – backing vocals (1, 11)
 Dorian Sherwood – backing vocals (1, 5, 8-11)
 Yvonne Williams – backing vocals (5, 8, 9)

Production 
 Corey Hart – producer 
 Humberto Gatica – producer, recording (1, 3, 4, 5, 7-11), mixing 
 Vito Luprano – executive producer 
 Alex Rodriguez – recording (1, 3, 4, 5, 7-11)
 Chuck Ainlay – recording (2, 6)
 Paul Boutin – recording assistant
 Chris Brooke – recording assistant 
 Kevin Wright – recording assistant (1, 4, 7)
 Terry Bradshaw – recording assistant (2, 4, 5, 7, 8, 11)
 Graham Lewis – recording assistant (2, 6)
 Vlado Meller – mastering 
 Catherine McRae – art direction, design 
 Randee St. Nicholas – photography

Studios
 Recorded at Record Plant, Rumbo Recorders, The Village Recorder and Westlake Studios (Los Angeles, California); Brooklyn Studios (Hollywood, California); Sound Stage Studios (Nashville, Tennessee).
 Mixed at Record Plant and Westlake Studios.
 Mastered at Sony Music Studios (New York City, New York).

References

1996 albums
Corey Hart (singer) albums
Albums produced by Humberto Gatica
Columbia Records albums